Mordellistena championi is a beetle in the genus Mordellistena of the family Mordellidae. It was described in 1930 by Ray and named after George Charles Champion.

References

championi
Beetles described in 1930